The 1908 Victorian state election was held in the Australian state of Victoria on 29 December 1908 to elect 40 of the 65 members of the state's Legislative Assembly. The other 25 seats were uncontested.

The election was in one member districts, using first-past-the-post voting.

Background
Ministerialists were a group of members of parliament who supported a government in office but were not bound by tight party discipline. Ministerialists represented loose pre-party groupings who held seats in state parliaments up to 1914. Such members ran for office as independents or under a variety of political labels but saw themselves as linked to other candidates by their support for a particular premier or government.

The Labor side of politics was controlled by the Political Labor Council. In 1904 Prendergast became the first leader of the Parliamentary Labor Party. The election saw the emergence of the Commonwealth Liberal Party in Victoria. In 1907, John Murray emerged as the leader of a country faction of Bent's Commonwealth Liberal Party, which opposed Bent's free-spending policies. During 1908, Bent's government began to disintegrate as a result of conflict between country and city interests. After the 1908 election, on 8 January 1909, Murray successfully moved a motion of no-confidence in Bent's government and succeeded him as Premier.

Results

Legislative Assembly 

|}

See also
Members of the Victorian Legislative Assembly, 1908–1911

References

1908 elections in Australia
Elections in Victoria (Australia)
1900s in Victoria (Australia)
December 1908 events